BARX homeobox 1 is a protein that in humans is encoded by the BARX1 gene.

Function

This gene encodes a member of the Bar subclass of homeobox transcription factors. Studies of the mouse and chick homolog suggest the encoded protein may play a role in developing teeth and craniofacial mesenchyme of neural crest origin. The protein may also be associated with differentiation of stomach epithelia. [provided by RefSeq, Jul 2008].

References

Further reading